The following is a list of Michigan State Historic Sites in Houghton County, Michigan. Sites marked with a dagger (†) are also listed on the National Register of Historic Places in Houghton County, Michigan.


Current listings

See also
 National Register of Historic Places listings in Houghton County, Michigan

Sources
 Historic Sites Online – Houghton County. Michigan State Housing Developmental Authority. Accessed January 23, 2011.

References

Houghton County
State Historic Sites
Tourist attractions in Houghton County, Michigan